The Sclerogibbidae are a small family of aculeate wasps in the superfamily Chrysidoidea.

Overview 
Sclerogibbidae are ectoparasitoids of Embioptera. The female wasp oviposits an egg on the abdomen of a host. Once the larva emerges, it attaches itself to its host. After the host is consumed, the larva detaches itself from the carcass and spins a cocoon. While in all modern species, females are wingless (apterous), this is not true for fossil species.

The currently recognised taxa within the family Sclerogibbidae are:

 subfamily †Sclerogibbodinae
 genus †Sclerogibbodes Engel & Grimaldi, 2006a Lebanese amber, Barremian
 subfamily Sclerogibbinae
 genus Caenosclerogibba Yasumatsu, 1958
 genus Probethylus Ashmead, 1902
 genus †Pterosclerogibba Olmi, 2005 Dominican amber, Miocene
 genus Sclerogibba Riggio & De Stefani-Perez, 1888
†Burmasclerogibba Perkovsky et al 2019 Burmese amber, Cenomanian
 †Chosia Fujiyama 1994 Choshi amber, Japan, Aptian
 †Cretosclerogibba Perkovsky et al 2019 Burmese amber, Cenomanian
 †Edrossia Perkovsky et al 2019 Burmese amber, Cenomanian
 †Gallosclerogibba Perkovsky et al 2019 Charentese amber, France, Cenomanian

References

Chrysidoidea
Apocrita families